Yangdachengzi is a town in western Jilin province of Northeast China.

Yangdachengzi is on the common border of three county-level divisions, which are Gongzhuling, Shuangliao and Changling County. As of 2008, it had a total population of 53,000, while the number of town district residents is 12,000.

History
According to the county annals of Huaide, the town began to form at about 300 years ago during the early Qing dynasty, and it has the longest commercial history in west area of Jilin province. Yangdachengzi began to build its city wall when Guangxu emperor was on his throne. After that, it became the county town of Huaide during the civil war from 1946 to 1949. It was the taoism center of west Jilin in Chiang Kai-shek-administrative period. The Foguang temple located in Yangdachengzi is one of the biggest buddhist temples in the area of Siping prefecture-level city.

Administration

The administrative structure of Yangdachengzi contains 1 subdistrict office and 21 villages:
 Yangchengzi
 Wuxing() 
 Heigangzi
 Kaoshan()
 Pingan
 Fengxiang
 Xinxing
 Shengli
 Laofangshen
 Xiataizi
 Wangjiayao
 Jianguo()
 Baoquan
 Wudatun
 Wangzapu
 Bazibao
 Fujugong
 Gongbeigou
 Guanjiagou
 Jinpen
 Changshan

References

Township-level divisions of Jilin